The Great Estuarine Group is a sequence of rocks which outcrop around the coast of the West Highlands of Scotland. Laid down in the Hebrides Basin during the middle Jurassic, they are the rough time equivalent of the Inferior and Great Oolite Groups found in southern England.

This sequence of rocks was originally named as the ‘Great Estuarine Series’ by the geologist, John Wesley Judd in 1878. There are outcrops on the islands of  Skye, Raasay, Eigg, Muck and Mull and on the Ardnamurchan peninsula. It comprises a series of shales, clays and sandstones of non-marine origin.

The Group overlies the Garantiana Mudstone of the 'Bearreraig Sandstone Formation' and is itself overlain by rocks of the 'Skye Lava Group', erupted during the Palaeocene.

The lowermost (and hence oldest) unit of the Great Estuarine Group is the ‘Cullaidh Shale Formation’. Overlying this is the 'Elgol Sandstone Formation', the type locality of which is to be found at the village of Elgol on Skye. These sandstones are interpreted as being deltaic in origin. Above the sandstone is the 'Lealt Shale Formation', a unit in which fossils of creatures which lived in brackish lagoons abound. These include mussels, sharks and plesiosaurs. The discovery of the first plesiosaur was made in 1844 by the geologist Hugh Miller. The ‘Kildonnan Member’ of the Lealt Shale Formation contains stromatolites and various microfossils such as dinoflagellates and acritarchs. The succeeding ‘Lonfearn Member’ consist of shales and thin shelly and oolitic limestones with conchostracan fossils. It has also yielded dinosaur footprints.

At the next stratigraphic level the ‘Valtos Sandstone Formation’ represents a further series of deltaic sandstones. Large calcareous concretions commonly occur within this formation. They are post-depositional in origin with individual nodules reaching more than a metre in diameter and cutting across the bedding. The ‘Duntulm Formation' succeeds the Valtos Formation and is in turn succeeded by the ‘Kilmaluag Formation’, and then by the youngest unit of the Great Estuarine Group, the ‘Skudiburgh Formation’.

See also 
 Geology of Scotland
 Hebridean Terrane

References 

Geological groups of the United Kingdom
Geologic formations of Scotland
Bajocian Stage
Bathonian Stage